Sharpie is a brand of writing implements (mainly permanent markers) manufactured by Newell Brands, a public company headquartered in Atlanta, Georgia. Originally designating a single permanent marker, the Sharpie brand has been widely expanded and can now be found on a variety of previously unrelated permanent and non-permanent pens and markers formerly marketed under other brands. This article focuses on the legacy Sharpie permanent marker line.

Sharpie markers are made with several tips, including ultra fine, extra fine, fine, brush, chisel, and retractable tips. Sharpie also produce gel and rollerball pens.

History 

"Sharpie" was originally a name designating a permanent marker launched in 1964 by the Sanford Ink Company (established in 1857). The Sharpie also became the first pen-style permanent marker.

In 1990, Sharpie was acquired by The Newell Companies (later Newell Rubbermaid) as part of Sanford, a leading manufacturer and marketer of writing instruments.

In 2005, the company's Accent highlighter brand was repositioned under the Sharpie brand name. The Sharpie Mini, a smaller marker with a clip for attaching a keychain or lanyard was also launched. In 2006, Sharpie introduced markers with button-activated retractable tips rather than a cap. Sharpie Paint markers were also introduced.  As of 2011, 200 million Sharpies had been sold worldwide. Sharpie markers are manufactured in Mexicali, Baja California, Mexico, and Maryville, Tennessee, and with numerous off-shore partners globally.

Marketing 

Sharpie sponsored the NASCAR Sprint Cup Series Sharpie 500, a night-time race at Bristol Motor Speedway, from 2001 through 2009. For the 2010 season, Newell Rubbermaid switched the sponsorship for this race to its Irwin Tools brand. Sharpie sponsored the Nationwide Series Sharpie Mini 300 race from 2004 to 2008. Before 2006, they sponsored Kurt Busch, who was the 2004 Sprint Cup champion. Sharpie also sponsored Jamie McMurray in the 2006 NASCAR Sprint Cup Series and the 2008 NASCAR Sprint Cup Series.

In recent years, Sharpie commercials have followed the slogan "Write Out Loud". These advertisements depict people using Sharpies in bad situations, such as using the marker to touch up a car and a college woman highlighting words in a book to notify a male student that his fly was open. Also, a middle-aged woman trying to think of what to write for her resignation letter, writes "I QUIT" with a red Sharpie. David Beckham is sponsored by Sharpie and appears in a commercial signing autographs with a Sharpie and trying to steal them.

In popular culture 

During an October 14, 2002 National Football League Monday Night Football game against the Seattle Seahawks, San Francisco 49ers wide receiver Terrell Owens pulled a black Sharpie marker out of his sock to sign the football he caught to score a touchdown and then gave the ball to his financial adviser, who was in the stands.

Special Camp David Sharpies were made for United States President George W. Bush.

Sharpies are the writing utensil of choice for astronauts aboard the International Space Station because of their usability in zero-gravity. According to Canadian astronaut Chris Hadfield, who commanded the International Space Station in 2012–2013, "you can hold it any which way and it still works".

Former president Donald Trump has a well-known preference for using Sharpies to sign official government documents, as he did when he gave autographs.

In September 2019, Trump was involved in a "Sharpie-gate" controversy, as CNN reported: "Trump defended an apparent Sharpie-altered map of Hurricane Dorian's predicted path."

References

External links

 

Brands that became generic
Newell Brands
Pens
Products introduced in 1964
Writing implements